Hekayate jangodaze vaghaye Yazd ela Shiraz is an Iranian magazine in Fars Province. The concessionaire of this magazine was Fathollah Yazdi (known as Maftoon) and it was published in Shiraz since 1912.

See also
List of magazines and newspapers of Fars

References

1912 establishments in Iran
Newspapers published in Fars Province
Magazines published in Iran
Magazines established in 1912
Mass media in Shiraz
Persian-language magazines
Mass media in Fars Province
Newspapers published in Qajar Iran